James Humphreys may refer to:

 James Humphreys (printer) (1748–1810), American-born publisher & politician
 James Humphreys (lawyer) (c. 1768–1830), British lawyer, writer and law reformer
 James Humphreys (pornographer) (1930–2003), British operator of adult book shops and strip clubs
 James E. Humphreys (1939–2020), American mathematician
 James Humphreys (author) (born 1967), British political strategist and fiction writer
 Jimmy Humphreys (1894–1956), Irish hurler

See also
 James Humphrey (disambiguation)
 Jimmie Humphries (1890–1971),  American baseball player